Kazi Farms Group' is one of the biggest businesses of the poultry industry in Bangladesh. Kazi Zahedul Hasan, the managing director, was awarded Business Person Of The Year for 2004 in Bangladesh.  It runs most of its office computers on free and open-source software such as Linux.

List of sister companies
 Kazi Farms Limited and associated poultry farming companies sell poultry chicks, poultry and fish feed, eggs, live chickens and organic fertilizer across Bangladesh.
 Kazi Food Industries Limited sells its Bellissimo and ZaNZee brands of ice cream, as well as Kazi Farms Kitchen brand of frozen food products across Bangladesh.
Kazi Media Limited (Deepto TV) began broadcasting on 18 November 2015
 Sysnova Information Systems Limited customizes and implements free/open-source Enterprise Resource Planning software for various companies in Bangladesh.

Controversy
On 22 September 2022, the Bangladesh Competition Commission filed a case against Kazi Farms for destabilizing the stable market by increasing the price of eggs at a higher rate than normal. Hearing the case four days later, the Bangladesh Competition Commission criticized the company for following a strange policy for fixing the price of eggs. In this auction system, the company finalizes a price after the dealers and distributors bid on the base price.
Kazi Farms replied that egg prices had indeed spiked abnormally for a week, but the reason was a shortage of trucks following a national increase in the price of diesel.
Singaporean economist Indranil Chakraborty examined Kazi Farms' auctions and found them to be a fair and reasonable means of selling agricultural commodities such as eggs, which typically fluctuate daily due to supply and demand.

References
 

Companies based in Dhaka
Food and drink companies of Bangladesh